The SPL Uusimaan piiri (Uusimaa Football Association) is one of the 12 district organisations of the Football Association of Finland. It administers lower tier football in Vantaa.

Background 

Suomen Palloliitto Uusimaan piiri, commonly referred to as SPL Uusimaan piiri or SPL Uusimaa, is the governing body for football in Vantaa.  Based in the city of Vantaa, the Association's Director is Matti Räisänen.

Member clubs

League Competitions 

SPL Uusimaan piiri run the following league competitions:

Men's Football
 Division 3 - Kolmonen  -  two sections
 Division 4 - Nelonen  -  two sections
 Division 5 - Vitonen  -  four sections
 Division 6 - Kutonen  -  seven sections

Ladies Football
 Division 3 - Kolmonen  -  one section

Footnotes

References

External links 
 SPL Uudenmaan piiri Official Website 

U